Manufacturers Railway may refer to:
Manufacturers Railway (St. Louis, Missouri), owned by Anheuser-Busch
Manufacturers Railway (Toledo, Ohio)